This is a list of members of the 15th Lok Sabha (2009–2014), arranged by state or territory represented. These members of the lower house of the Indian Parliament were elected at the 2009 Indian general election held in April–May 2009.

Andhra Pradesh
Keys:

Arunachal Pradesh

Keys:

Assam

Keys:

Bihar

Keys:

Chhattisgarh
Keys:

Goa
Keys:

Gujarat
Keys:

Haryana
Keys:

Himachal Pradesh
Keys:

Jammu & Kashmir
Keys:

Jharkhand
Keys:

Karnataka
Keys:

Kerala
Keys:

Madhya Pradesh
Keys:

Maharashtra
Keys:

Manipur
Keys:

Meghalaya
Keys:

Mizoram
Keys:

Nagaland
Keys:

Odisha
Keys:

Punjab
Keys:

Rajasthan

Keys:

Sikkim
Keys:

Tamil Nadu
Keys:

Tripura
Keys:

Uttar Pradesh
Keys:

Uttarakhand
Keys:

West Bengal
Keys:

Andaman and Nicobar Islands
Keys:

Chandigarh
Keys:

Dadra and Nagar Haveli
Keys:

Daman and Diu
Keys:

NCT Of Delhi
Keys:

Lakshadweep
Keys:

Puducherry
Keys:

Nominated
Keys:

See also
 List of members of the 14th Lok Sabha 
 List of members of the 16th Lok Sabha

References

External links

List
15
15th Lok Sabha